Kendriya Vidyalaya, Adoor is a CBSE Higher Secondary School located in Adoor in the Indian state of Kerala. It operates I to XII grade with Science, Commerce and Computer Science streams in +2 level. The main objective of Kendriya Vidyalaya is to cater to the educational needs of the children of transferable Central Government employees including Defence and Para-Military personnel by providing a common syllabus and system of education. The institution is affiliated to Central Board of Secondary Education (CBSE). 

The school enrolls some one thousand five hundred students with about 56 staff.

The results in Class X and XII board examinations have been consistently good.

Nine staff housing units are available. Nine additional classrooms and a second computer lab were added.

Governance 
The school is run by Kendriya Vidyalaya Sangathan, an autonomous body under the Department of Education, Ministry of HRD, of Government of India.

History
This school was established in 1993 by the central government. The school office opened on 9 August with 1 Principal,1 Teacher,1 L D C and 1 GroupD. Classes started on 17 September. The campus included 3 acres of land along with old buildings used as temporary measure to house the School. Staff strength grew to 12 including office staff. The first class graduated in 1999.

Construction of the school building started in 1998 and the building opened in March 2001. 

The Vidyalaya started +2 Stream in Science in 2002. The School was upgraded to Senior Secondary in 2002 and the first XII students passed out in 2004. 

Due to heavy demand for admission, a shift system was introduced in 2004. Classes up to XII in Science stream in Shift I and up to XII Commerce in Shift II. The Second Division for classes 2,3,4,5 was sanctioned in 2006. A Science stream was started in Shift II in 2007-08. In 2009 Sanction for one more division classes 1-4 was obtained and admissions made.

The headmaster of the first shift is Sri John Mathew.

Languages

Hindi is taught from class I onwards.
Sanskrit is taught as a compulsory subject from classes VI to VIII and as an optional subject till class XII.

Notable alumni

 Joseph Samuel took 2nd in the CBSE exam.

See also
Kendriya Vidyalaya
Kendriya Vidyalaya Alumni
Adoor
CBSE

References

External links
Kendriya Vidyalaya Adoor

Schools in Pathanamthitta district
Educational institutions established in 1993
1993 establishments in Kerala
Kendriya Vidyalayas in Kerala